Torbjörn Törnqvist (born 1953) is a Swedish billionaire, and the CEO and co-founder of Gunvor, "one of the largest commodities conglomerates in the world", with the Russian billionaire, Gennady Timchenko.

Early life
Törnqvist was born in 1953, in Stockholm, Sweden. He has a degree from Stockholm University.

Career
Törnqvist co-founded Gunvor in 1997, and he is its CEO.

In 2016, he reduced his stake in Gunvor from 78% to 70%, and received a special dividend of about $1 billion, part of which went to repay his co-founder Gennady Timchenko, who sold his 44% to Törnqvist in March 2014, a day before Timchenko was sanctioned by the US for his "close ties to Vladimir Putin".

Controversies

In 2017, a Swedish Radio documentary presented evidence that Gunvor had been involved in a Belarusian oil smuggling scheme under Törnqvist's watch, featuring corruption at the highest levels in the Belarus government.
This documentary, which includes an interview with Törnqvist, won the 2017 Prix Europa award in the "Radio Current Affairs" category.
Gunvor has officially denied any wrongdoing.

Sailing
Törnqvist is a keen sailor, and the head of Artemis Racing, who have competed in the America’s Cup.

Personal life
Törnqvist lives in Geneva, Switzerland.

His first wife was Eva Birgitta Törnqvist. His second wife is Natalia Törnqvist.

References

1953 births
Living people
Businesspeople from Stockholm
Swedish expatriates in Switzerland
Stockholm University alumni
Swedish company founders
Swedish billionaires
Artemis Racing sailors